Saiyed Zegham Murtaza सैयद ज़ैग़म मुर्तज़ा (سید ضیغم مرتضیٰ) is an Indian Columnist and blogger.  He is the author of Policenama- Jahan Murde bhi Gawahi dete hain, a book published by the Rajpal and Sons. Also, he has translated the Hindi version of Gautam Bhatia's book "Offend, Shock, or Disturb: Free Speech under the Indian Constitution" for Oxford University Press. He has scripted and produced many documentaries. Also, he is the founder of a media production company APZ Media Ventures Private Limited.

Early life

He was born in the city of Amroha in the district of Moradabad (now Amroha) in Uttar Pradesh. He passed his higher secondary from Meerut Public School Meerut, did his graduation from J.S. Hindu College, Amroha, Master's Degree in Journalism from Department of Journalism, AMU, Aligarh, and LLB. from KGK College, Moradabad. He belongs to the reputed family of Sayyids of Syed Nagli. His father Saiyed Ali Zafar was a trade unionist and a social activist. His Grandfather Maulvi Murtaza Hussain was an ex-Armymen and a Freedom Fighter. One of his uncles Dr. Naseem uz Zafar Baquiri is a renowned poet.

Work
His journalistic stints include working with Rajya Sabha Television, Eenadu Television, Hindustan Times, and Asiaville News. His columns regularly appear in The Pioneer, Navjivan, National Herald, Asiaville News, Navbharat Times, Hindustan times and The Forward Press. Also, he wrote the script of several documentary films, including that of Brigadier Rajinder Singh: The Savior of Kashmir, The Guests of Destiny,Sangharsh etc. He is also an independent voice, supporting the cause of education among Muslims of India. Recently, he formed a media company, APZ Media Venture Private Limited along with Aman and Parijat.

See also 
 List of Indian journalists
 People from Amroha district

References

Living people
Indian journalists
People from Amroha
People from Amroha district
People from Uttar Pradesh
Indian columnists
Indian bloggers
Indian Muslims
Indian Muslim activists
Aligarh Muslim University alumni
1980 births